The Jacksonville Jewish Center was formed by Orthodox Jewish families in Jacksonville, Florida. The congregation incorporated as the Hebrew Orthodox Congregation B'nai Israel in 1901.  The congregation grew and a synagogue was built at the corner of Jefferson and Duval Streets in 1907.

In 1927 a larger building was built at the corner of Third and Silver Streets in Springfield.  It was named the Jacksonville Jewish Center.  The center expanded over the next 35 years.  By 1959 there were three large buildings, housing a sanctuary, with a chapel, library, social hall, school, auditorium, offices, and other meeting rooms. In 1963 the center started moving to a new site at 3662 Crown Point Road in Mandarin.  The official move to the new location occurred in 1976.

The Jacksonville Job Corps used the old facilities for some time. The historic center was nominated for the National Register of Historic Places in 2010 and added to the list in 2021.  There was a fire in the original building in 2011 and it was demolished.  The cornerstone of the building was saved and moved to Klutho Park on the other side of Third Street.

References

 The History of the Jacksonville Jewish Center - 1901 to 1960, by Philip N. Selber

National Register of Historic Places in Jacksonville, Florida